The Arsenal Penitentiary was a penal institution in Washington, D. C. used as a military prison during the American Civil War, currently located inside Fort Lesley J. McNair. Four Lincoln assassination conspirators, David Herold, Lewis Powell, George Atzerodt, and Mary Surratt were executed on the grounds of the Arsenal Penitentiary on July 7, 1865.

History
The Arsenal Penitentiary opened in 1831 on the Greenleaf Point at the confluence of the Potomac River and the Anacostia River within the District of Columbia. It was designed by Charles Bulfinch and constructed adjacent to the north side of the Washington Arsenal separated by a wall.

During the Civil War, the penitentiary was closed in September 1862 to store munitions on the request of the Ordnance Department. Its civilian inmates were sent to the Albany Penitentiary and court-martialed soldiers — to the Old Capital Prison. It was reactivated as a military prison in April 1865, and it was where eight Lincoln assassination conspirators were held, put to trial, and four of them were executed. 

They were buried along with John Booth in the prison's storeroom. In 1869 the bodies were released to the families.   

The former Arsenal Penitentiary is a part of a restricted military installation and is closed to the public.

See also 
 USS Saugus (1863)

References

Further reading 
 Edward Steers Jr., and Harold Holzer, Editors. The Lincoln Assassination Conspirators: The Confinement and Execution, As Recorded In The Letterbook of John Frederick Hartranft. Baton Rouge: Louisiana State University Press, 2009
 Sullivan, David K. Prison Walls: The Operation of the District Penitentiary, 1831-1862, Records of the Columbia Historical Society, Washington, D.C., vol. 71/72, 1971, pp. 243–66.

External links
 Materials of Old Penitentiary in Washington. Letter from the Secretary of War, Relative to the Taking Down and Removing the Material of the Old Penitentiary Situated on the Washington Arsenal Ground. January 31, 1873. -- Referred to the Committee on Public Buildings and Grounds and Ordered to be Printed, Issue 1567 of United States congressional serial set

American Civil War prison camps
Defunct prisons in Washington, D.C.
Washington, D.C., in the American Civil War